A blood gill is a gill like structure restricted to organs with spacious lumen and poorly developed/absent trachea, found in larvae of aquatic insects. Specific research questions the functionality of this gill to respiration, and concludes it exists more likely to absorb water.

References 

Insect anatomy